Tsogtyn Batbayar was mayor of Mongolia's capital Ulaanbaatar from 2005 to December 2007. His successor is Tüdeviin Bilegt.

Batbayar is a member of the predominantly ex-communist Mongolian People's Revolutionary Party, or MPRP. The city council of Ulaanbaatar selected Batbayar as mayor in 2005.

Batbayar visited the United States, including the United Nations, in October 2006.

References

Mayors of places in Mongolia
Ulaanbaatar
Year of birth missing (living people)
Living people
Mongolian People's Party politicians